The Gravemind is a fictional, parasitic, hive mind intelligence in the Halo universe. While only one Gravemind is ever seen in the games, the title is given to the final stage of Flood evolution, in which the Flood becomes a superorganism.  The Flood is a highly-infectious parasite which is released several times during Halos story. The Chief and the Arbiter (Thel 'Vadam, during the course of Halo 2 and Halo 3) are captured during their separate missions on Delta Halo, or Installation 05, by a Gravemind, which resides in the bowels of the ancient Forerunners ringworld, where the Flood creature forges an alliance between the two foes in order to stop the activation of the ringworld — an event which would destroy all sentient life in the galaxy, and, therefore, starve the Flood to death. The character is voiced by Dee Bradley Baker.

Making its first appearance in Halo 2, the Gravemind was introduced to dispel the idea that the Flood is a mindless virus. The character was designed by a Bungie team, including artists Robert McLees and Juan Ramirez, and slowly developed into a massive creature with tentacles and a frightening level of intelligence. Driven by a desire to spread, the Gravemind is cunning and manipulative; he forges alliances as often as he tries to consume his allies, tricking the Master Chief into aiding him while infecting the Chief's compatriots at the same time. The character has had a mixed reception by many critics upon his appearance in Halo 2, and reviewers including 1UP.com found his role in Halo 3 confusing and without clear motive. More positively, critic Aaron Sagers used Gravemind as an example of a "frenemy" — the creature's appearance made the Master Chief's fight against the Flood more personal and more dramatic.

Design and attributes

Early Concepts for the Gravemind were done by Bungie artist Robert McLees. McLees is known at Bungie as the "architect of the Flood", and had done the early concepts for the Flood forms in Halo: Combat Evolved. McLees's original drawings were then added to by Juan Ramirez. The Gravemind's form and design constantly changed during development. Early versions of the creature had a basic shape of a mass of tentacles, with a jagged tear in one large appendage forming a rudimentary mouth. Later on, the mouth was studded with the skulls of human and Covenant corpses for teeth. This design was later revised due to practical considerations about lip syncing the character for speech. Despite these design changes, the Gravemind's size was always meant to be huge; early concepts showed the Master Chief dwarfed by the Flood intelligence.

Unlike the mindless "zombie" nature of most Flood, the Gravemind is depicted as intelligent and cunning, and acts as a collective mind driving the Flood. It speaks in verse rather than prose, using trochaic or iambic heptameter. While capable of subterfuge, Gravemind is seen to use the brute strength and sheer numbers of the Flood to further its aims. When attacking planets, the Gravemind of the Forerunners' time used smaller craft as ablative armor, sacrificing countless Flood so that larger ships can land and infest major population centers. In a more strategic move, Gravemind uses logic to sway the Forerunners' own artificial intelligence, Mendicant Bias, to his side. While Mendicant Bias had been specifically created to defeat the Gravemind, the Flood leader convinces the AI that the Flood is a utopian ideal, and that its conquest of the galaxy is inevitable. While the Gravemind's motivations and goals are not made expressly clear in Halo 2, Halo 3 reveals Gravemind's ultimate goal is to consume all thinking beings in the galaxy.

The Gravemind's physical form is depicted as composed of rotting corpses and biomatter, towering nearly eighty meters high as seen in Halo 2. Gravemind resembles a large Venus Flytrap with many tentacles, but is capable of movement and linguistic communication via its large mouth formed from overlapping fleshy "leaves". Though an animal, the Gravemind's somewhat plantlike appearance has drawn comparisons to Audrey II from the 1986 film Little Shop of Horrors due to the tentacles about a central mouth.

Appearances
The Gravemind makes his first appearance halfway through Halo 2s campaign. Using his tentacles to save the Master Chief and Arbiter from perishing, Gravemind brings them face to face in a chasm on Delta Halo. Gravemind reveals to the Arbiter that the ring's architects, the Forerunners, died when they activated the installation in order to stop the threat of the Flood; the Master Chief verifies what the creature says, having stopped the firing of another ring in Halo: Combat Evolved. Though the Arbiter does not accept the truth immediately, Gravemind sends the Master Chief to the Covenant city High Charity and the Arbiter to the Halo's control room in order to stop the deluded Covenant from killing all sentient life a second time. Though he promises an alliance, Gravemind has ulterior motives. His Flood infest the human ship In Amber Clad and makes a slipspace jump into High Charity itself, in an effort to use the station to escape the confines of Halo. Having taken over the city, Gravemind questions the A.I. Cortana, who was left behind to destroy High Charity if Halo was activated. Gravemind says that he has questions that he will ask, and Cortana agrees to answer them. A short story in the 2009 Halo: Evolutions anthology details the conversations that follow.

Gravemind is one of the primary antagonists of Halo 3. While the Master Chief and Arbiter have returned to Earth in order to stop the Prophet of Truth, the religious leader of the Covenant, from activating a Forerunners artifact buried in Africa, Gravemind turns High Charity into a Flood hive and sends an infected cruiser to Earth in an attempt to infest the planet; this plan fails, and a message from Cortana informs the Master Chief and allies of the existence of the Ark, a special installation built by the Forerunners outside of the Milky Way galaxy where all the Halos can be fired remotely. Seeking to stop the rings from firing by Truth, Gravemind manipulates Arbiter and Chief as allies, so the Flood once again ally with the Chief and Arbiter. As soon as Truth is killed, however, the Gravemind then turns on both Chief and Arbiter, where the pair escapes the Flood's clutches and Chief rescues Cortana from High Charity. Despite being tortured by Gravemind, Cortana has managed to keep a secret safe from the Flood; she has the activation index of Installation 04, which she captured from 343 Guilty Spark during Halo: Combat Evolved. Using the index, Cortana can activate the local ringworld, destroying Gravemind and the Flood, but sparing the galaxy's sentient life. Gravemind finally gains this knowledge, but too late; the Master Chief escapes with Cortana, destroying High Charity in the process. Gravemind survives the blast and attempts to rebuild himself on the new ring. Despite his best efforts, the Master Chief and company activate Halo, destroying it and finally defeating the Flood. Resigned to his defeat, Gravemind nonetheless insists that it will only slow – not stop – the Flood.

Other appearances of the Gravemind is in Halo Wars and the Halo Wars 2 expansion "Awakening the Nightmare". The Gravemind's conversations with Cortana after Halo 2 and during Halo 3 are detailed in the Halo Evolutions short story anthology.

Reception
Critical reception of the leader of the Flood were mixed. In a review of Halo 2, Mike Leonard of the AllXbox community said that the introduction of the Gravemind character had him "rolling my eyes hard enough to get motion sickness from seeing the back of the inside of my skull"; Leonard went on to say that the "Little Shop of Horrors reject" ruined the "cool" of the Halo franchise. Staff from GamesRadar singled out the appearance of the Gravemind as a sign the Halo series had jumped the shark. "Until Gravemind showed up, we were pretty sure we understood the Halo series' story," they wrote, but that the appearance of a Venus Flytrap-like creature with an ego and "a tendency to spout philosophical drivel" was unexpected. Jeremy Parish of 1UP.com bemoaned the fact that Gravemind was never explicitly stated to be the Flood leader in either Halo 2 or Halo 3 and was hardly seen in the third installment. Publications also took issue with the fact that the character's motivations were never fully explored; the South Florida Sun-Sentinel said that the "unique and compelling characters" of Halo 3, such as Cortana and the Master Chief, were overwhelmed by Gravemind.

More favorably, Aaron Sagers of the newspaper The Morning Call saw Gravemind as a perfect example of a trend in pop culture called a "frenemy". A frenemy, according to Sagers, is a friend or rival "with whom [the protagonist] feuds; an individual who reinvigorates the sense of self-worth and drives up one's visibility in the public's eye." Gravemind, operating as a frenemy, served to personify the Master Chief's otherwise nebulous fight against the Flood. Will Prusik of PlanetXbox360 listed the Flood as one of the great video game aliens, and that the revelation of a central Flood intelligence was a good idea despite the Gravemind's resemblance to Audrey II.

See also 

Collective consciousness
Collective intelligence
Collective memory

References

External links
The Gravemind's profile  at Halowaypoint.com

Extraterrestrial characters in video games
Fictional parasites and parasitoids
Fictional mass murderers
Fictional superorganisms
Halo (franchise) characters
Hive minds in fiction
Microsoft antagonists
Video game characters introduced in 2004

ja:HALO (ビデオゲームシリーズ)#グレイブマインド